In Greek mythology, Harpale (Ancient Greek: Αρπάλε) was the mother of Poseidon's son Cycnus, king of Colonae in Troad. Otherwise, the mother of the latter was called Scamandrodice or Calyce, daughter of Hecaton, or lastly, an unknown Nereid.

Notes

References 

 Gaius Julius Hyginus, Fabulae from The Myths of Hyginus translated and edited by Mary Grant. University of Kansas Publications in Humanistic Studies. Online version at the Topos Text Project.

Women of Poseidon